Durga Cinetone was an Indian film studio established in 1936 in Rajahmundry, Andhra Pradesh, India by Nidamarthi Surayya. It was the first South Indian film studio. Due to financial crisis, the studio was later shut down.

Films produced

References 

Film production companies of India
Indian film studios
1936 establishments in India
Film production companies of Andhra Pradesh